Pisgah Astronomical Research Institute (PARI) (pronounced perry) is a non-profit astronomical observatory located in the Pisgah National Forest near Balsam Grove, North Carolina. PARI operates multiple radio telescopes and optical telescopes for research and teaching purposes. The observatory is affiliated with the University of North Carolina system through the Pisgah Astronomical Research and Science Educational Center (PARSEC).

History
PARI is located at the site of the former Rosman Satellite Tracking Station, which was established by the National Aeronautics and Space Administration (NASA) in 1962. The site was part of the worldwide Spacecraft Tracking and Data Acquisition Network and an integral communications link for the manned space programs Project Gemini and Project Apollo.

The facility was transferred to the National Security Agency (NSA) in 1981. Known as the Rosman Research Station, it was used as a signals intelligence gathering facility. The site was closed by the NSA in 1995 and transferred to the United States Forest Service.

After several years of inactivity, the federal government proposed to dismantle the facility.  Recognizing the utility of the site, a small group of interested scientists and businessmen formed a not-for-profit foundation, which acquired the site in January 1999. It has continued capital investment at the facility, enabling updates of the equipment for astronomical observation purposes. A staff of professional astronomers, engineers, and other scientists work at the observatory.

Research and education
PARI hosts research and study programs with Furman University, Clemson University, Virginia Tech, South Carolina State University and Duke University. The PARI site has hosted several professional astronomy meetings, including the Small Radio Telescope Conference in August 2001, the Gamma-Ray Bursts Today and Tomorrow Conference in August 2002 and the Workshop on a National Plan for Preserving Astronomical Photographic Plates in November 2007.

PARI hosts several educational opportunities, including the Duke University Talent Identification Program. PARI also sponsors astronomy educational programs using the portable StarLab planetarium. These have been presented to more than 40,000 people in Western North Carolina.

Facilities

The principal radio research instruments at PARI are two 26-meter radio telescopes and a 4.6-meter radio telescope named Smiley. These have been adapted for precision tracking of celestial radio sources using multiple frequencies.  Smiley is used for remote classroom teaching of astronomy by students in the US and worldwide. Smiley was given its pleasant face around 1982 as a greeting to overflying foreign surveillance satellites.

PARI is home to the Astronomical Photographic Data Archive (APDA), a site to help preserve astronomical photographic plates. These plates were the primary recording medium for astronomy data from the late 19th century until the 1980s. It is estimated that over two million of the plates are held in astronomy facilities around the world and are in jeopardy of being destroyed because of a lack of storage facilities.

An Exhibit Gallery displays a collection of rare meteorites and minerals, as well as NASA Space Shuttle artifacts. Many of the latter are from space flights.

See also
 List of astronomical observatories
 List of radio telescopes

Notes

General references
Goldman, Stuart J. "Mission Possible: The Promise of Pisgah." Sky & Telescope. October 2001:42.
Hargreaves, Lynley.  "Spy Station Retooled into Astronomy Institute". Physics Today.  March 2001 Volume 54, number 3.

External links
 Pisgah Astronomical Research Institute (PARI)
 Virginia Tech Eight Meter Transient Array

Astronomical observatories in North Carolina
Radio telescopes
Buildings and structures in Transylvania County, North Carolina
University of North Carolina
Pisgah National Forest
Education in Transylvania County, North Carolina
Tourist attractions in Transylvania County, North Carolina
National Security Agency facilities